Ermias Wolday is an Eritrean footballer who currently plays for Hume United.

Club career
In 2011, he signed with FFSA Super League club Croydon Kings after being granted political asylum by the Australian government.

International career
He played in the 2009 CECAFA Cup in Kenya, scoring an own goal in the 2–1 group match defeat to Rwanda.

Personal life

Whilst competing in the 2009 CECAFA Cup in Kenya he was part of the Eritrea national football team which failed to return home after competing in the regional tournament in Nairobi. After receiving political asylum from the Australian government, the team moved to Adelaide, Australia.

References

External links
 

Living people
Eritrean footballers
Eritrean expatriate footballers
Eritrea international footballers
Adulis Club players
Year of birth missing (living people)
Association football defenders
FFSA Super League players
Croydon Kings players
Western Strikers SC players
Adelaide Comets FC players
Expatriate soccer players in Australia
Eritrean refugees
Eritrean Premier League players